Nazarene Bible Institute was a Bible college in Pilot Point, Texas. It has since closed.

History
The institute was established 1905 in Pilot Point by the Holiness Church of Christ.  After the Holiness Church of Christ merged with the Pentecostal Church of the Nazarene in 1908, the school was named Nazarene Bible Institute and became an official institution of the Abilene District Church of the Nazarene. In 1911, it closed and merged with Central Nazarene College to the west in Hamlin, Texas because Texas Holiness University in nearby Peniel, Texas had joined the Dallas District Church of the Nazarene.

Notes and references

Defunct Nazarene universities and colleges
1911 disestablishments in Texas
Educational institutions established in 1905
Defunct private universities and colleges in Texas
1905 establishments in Texas